In mathematics and statistics, the arithmetic mean, arithmetic average, or just the mean or average (when the context is clear), is the sum of a collection of numbers divided by the count of numbers in the collection. The collection is often a set of results from an experiment, an observational study, or a survey. The term "arithmetic mean" is preferred in some mathematics and statistics contexts because it helps distinguish it from other types of means, such as geometric and harmonic.

In addition to mathematics and statistics, the arithmetic mean is frequently used in economics, anthropology, history, and almost every academic field to some extent. For example, per capita income is the arithmetic average income of a nation's population.

While the arithmetic mean is often used to report central tendencies, it is not a robust statistic: it is greatly influenced by outliers (values much larger or smaller than most others). For skewed distributions, such as the distribution of income for which a few people's incomes are substantially higher than most people's, the arithmetic mean may not coincide with one's notion of "middle". In that case, robust statistics, such as the median, may provide a better description of central tendency.

Definition
Given a data set , the arithmetic mean (also mean or average), denoted  (read  bar), is the mean of the  values .

The arithmetic mean is a data set's most commonly used and readily understood measure of central tendency. In statistics, the term average refers to any measurement of central tendency. The arithmetic mean of a set of observed data is equal to the sum of the numerical values of each observation, divided by the total number of observations. Symbolically, for a data set consisting of the values , the arithmetic mean is defined by the formula:

(For an explanation of the summation operator, see summation.)

If the data set is a statistical population (i.e., consists of every possible observation and not just a subset of them), then the mean of that population is called the population mean and denoted by the Greek letter . If the data set is a statistical sample (a subset of the population), it is called the sample mean (which for a data set  is denoted as ).

The arithmetic mean can be similarly defined for vectors in multiple dimensions, not only scalar values; this is often referred to as a centroid. More generally, because the arithmetic mean is a convex combination (meaning its coefficients sum to ), it can be defined on a convex space, not only a vector space.

Motivating properties
The arithmetic mean has several properties that make it interesting, especially as a measure of central tendency. These include:

If numbers  have mean , then . Since  is the distance from a given number to the mean, one way to interpret this property is by saying that the numbers to the left of the mean are balanced by the numbers to the right. The mean is the only number for which the residuals (deviations from the estimate) sum to zero.  This can also be interpretted as saying that the mean is translationally invariant in the sense that for any real number , .
The sample mean is also the best single predictor because it has the lowest root mean squared error. If the arithmetic mean of a population of numbers is desired, then the estimate of it that is unbiased is the arithmetic mean of a sample drawn from the population.

The arithmetic mean is independent of scale of the units of measurement, in the sense that   So, for example, calculating a mean of liters and then converting to gallons is the same as converting to gallons first and then calculating the mean.  This is also called first order homogeneity.

Additional properties
 The arithmetic mean of a sample is always between the largest and smallest values in that sample.
The arithmetic mean of any amount of equal-sized number groups together is the arithmetic mean of the arithmetic means of each group.

Contrast with median

The arithmetic mean may be contrasted with the median. The median is defined such that no more than half the values are larger, and no more than half are smaller than it. If elements in the data increase arithmetically when placed in some order, then the median and arithmetic average are equal. For example, consider the data sample . The average value can vary considerably from most values in the sample and can be larger or smaller than most.

There are applications of this phenomenon in many fields. For example, since the 1980s, the median income in the United States has increased more slowly than the arithmetic average of income.

Generalizations

Weighted average

A weighted average, or weighted mean, is an average in which some data points count more heavily than others in that they are given more weight in the calculation.

Continuous probability distributions

If a numerical property, and any sample of data from it, can take on any value from a continuous range instead of, for example, just integers, then the probability of a number falling into some range of possible values can be described by integrating a continuous probability distribution across this range, even when the naive probability for a sample number taking one certain value from infinitely many is zero. In this context, the analog of a weighted average, in which there are infinitely many possibilities for the precise value of the variable in each range, is called the mean of the probability distribution. The most widely encountered probability distribution is called the normal distribution; it has the property that all measures of its central tendency, including not just the mean but also the median mentioned above and the mode (the three Ms), are equal. This equality does not hold for other probability distributions, as illustrated for the log-normal distribution here.

Angles

Particular care is needed when using cyclic data, such as phases or angles. Taking the arithmetic mean of 1° and 359° yields a result of 180°.
This is incorrect for two reasons:
Thus, these could easily be called 1° and -1°, or 361° and 719°, since each one of them produces a different average.
Secondly, in this situation, 0° (or 360°) is geometrically a better average value: there is lower dispersion about it (the points are both 1° from it and 179° from 180°, the putative average).

In general application, such an oversight will lead to the average value artificially moving towards the middle of the numerical range. A solution to this problem is to use the optimization formulation (that is, define the mean as the central point: the point about which one has the lowest dispersion) and redefine the difference as a modular distance (i.e., the distance on the circle: so the modular distance between 1° and 359° is 2°, not 358°).

Symbols and encoding

Some software (text processors, web browsers) may not display the "x̄" symbol correctly. For example, the HTML symbol "x̄" combines two codes — the base letter "x" plus a code for the line above (̄ or ¯).

In some document formats (such as PDF), the symbol may be replaced by a "¢" (cent) symbol when copied to a text processor such as Microsoft Word.

See also

Fréchet mean
Generalized mean
Geometric mean
Harmonic mean
Inequality of arithmetic and geometric means
Sample mean and covariance
Standard deviation
Standard error of the mean
Summary statistics

References

Further reading

External links
Calculations and comparisons between arithmetic mean and geometric mean of two numbers
Calculate the arithmetic mean of a series of numbers on fxSolver

Means